The Gaslight was an automobile manufactured in Detroit, Michigan by the Gaslight Motors Company from 1960-c.1961. The Gaslight was a venture that built a replica-style veteran car, based on the 1902 Rambler. It sold for $1,495.

See also
List of defunct United States automobile manufacturers

References
 

Defunct motor vehicle manufacturers of the United States
Motor vehicle manufacturers based in Michigan
Defunct manufacturing companies based in Michigan